John Henderson (1895 – 1957) was a Scottish professional footballer. He played for Manchester City, Southend United, Gillingham and Dunfermline Athletic shortly after the First World War. He was born and died in Kelty.

References

1895 births
Scottish footballers
Gillingham F.C. players
Manchester City F.C. players
Southend United F.C. players
Dunfermline Athletic F.C. players
1957 deaths
Association footballers not categorized by position